Mahatma Gandhi Road is a station of the Kolkata Metro. The station is located on Chittaranjan Avenue, close to Burrabazar.

History

Construction

The station

Structure
Mahatma Gandhi Road is underground metro station, situated on the Kolkata Metro Line 1 of Kolkata Metro.

Station layout

Connections

Bus
Bus route number 3B, 24, 24B, 28, 30B/1, 30C, 39A/2, 43, 44, 44A, 47B, 71, 72, 78, 214, 214A, 215, 215/1, 215A/1, 219, 219/1, 222, 237, L238, 242, 25 (Mini), 27A (Mini), S139 (Mini), S151 (Mini), S152 (Mini), S159 (Mini), S160 (Mini), S161 (Mini), S163 (Mini), S164 (Mini), S172 (Mini), S175 (Mini), S181 (Mini), S184 (Mini), S186 (Mini), C28, E25, E32, M24, MIDI1, S9A, S10, S11, S15G, S17A, S32, S32A, S57, AC2, AC10, AC15, AC20, AC39, AC40, AC54, VS1, VS2 etc. serve the station.

Train
Sealdah railway station is located nearby.

Tram
Tram route number 18 serves the station.

Entry/Exit

Gallery

See also

Kolkata
List of Kolkata Metro stations
Transport in Kolkata
Kolkata Metro Rail Corporation
Kolkata Suburban Railway
Kolkata Monorail
Trams in Kolkata
Bhowanipore
Chowringhee Road
List of rapid transit systems
List of metro systems

References

External links

 
 Official Website for line 1
 UrbanRail.Net – descriptions of all metro systems in the world, each with a schematic map showing all stations.

Kolkata Metro stations
Railway stations in Kolkata